There are two railway stations named  in Naniwa-ku, Osaka, Japan.  One is the terminus of the Hankai Tramway Hankai Line, and the other is a metro station on the Osaka Metro Sakaisuji Line.

Layout

Hankai Tramway Hankai Line
3 bay platforms serving two tracks are located on the ground.

Osaka Metro Sakaisuji Line

1 island platform with two tracks is located underground.

Around the station
Nippombashi area
Aizomebashi Hospital
Shinsekai
Tsutenkaku
Tennoji Park, Tennoji Zoo (Shinsekai Gate)

Stations next to Ebisuchō

External links
  Ebisucho Station from Osaka Metro website
  Ebisucho Station from Osaka Metro website

Railway stations in Osaka Prefecture
Osaka Metro stations
Hankai Line
Railway stations in Japan opened in 1911
Railway stations in Japan opened in 1969